Eddie Butcher (8 May 1900 – 8 September 1980) was an Irish traditional singer, folk-song collector and songwriter from Magilligan, County Londonderry. He had an extensive repertoire of songs that he performed in a sturdy, earthy style. In 1953, Dr. Hugh Shields began to notate and record Butcher's songs, published later in two books: Shamrock, Rose & Thistle (1981) and All the Days of his Life (2011), the latter accompanied by a set of three CDs. Starting in 1966, Butcher performed in frequent radio broadcasts from Dublin and Belfast, and recorded four albums of his songs, on one EP and three LPs.

He inspired other singers such as Joe Holmes, Len Graham, and Frank Harte, as well as a younger generation of musicians, notably Andy Irvine and Paul Brady who added musical accompaniment to some of his songs.

Early life and employment
Eddie Butcher was born on 8 May 1900, in a house that stood on the dividing line between the small townlands of Duncrun and Tamlaght, and lived all his life in Magilligan, County Londonderry, in the far north-west corner of modern Ulster.
He was the fifth of John and Elizabeth (Clyde) Butcher's ten children brought up from the 1890s to the 1920s, and whose names are, in order of seniority: Robert, Katey, Rose, Patrick, Eddie, John, Willy, Maggie, Lily, and Jimmy. All except Lily were singers and those who were old enough  learned the core of their repertory from their father, who died in 1920 and had been a daysman, or day labourer for local farmers. 

Butcher started work by lifting potatoes at the age of 12, and later went for hiring at "the Rabble" and "the Gallop", the hiring fairs in Coleraine and Limavady respectively, in May and November. By the time he was 20,  he was a daysman himself. In his late twenties, he turned from farm work to a variety of other jobs, such a working as a gardener and handyman, peat-cutting, building, road-making, thatching and working in a quarry, often cycling long distances to and from work each day. 

Before he retired, he spent 18 years with the Ministry of Agriculture on the River Roe drainage project.

Singing career
Both Butcher and his wife Gracie, whom he married in 1933, came from noted local singing families, and whenever there was a dance or another occasion in the vicinity, Butcher's father would be asked to come along to sing, and the brothers and sisters of both families were also well-known performers, locally. During Butcher's childhood, their house was always one of the most popular cèilidh houses in Magilligan, with neighbours dropping in regularly for a night of craic, until the practice died out in the area.

Before he left home, Butcher learned the greater part of his repertoire from his father and, later, from his brothers and from Gracie's sisters. He also had a gift for writing his own songs, set to traditional airs and often about local events or his own experience as a farm labourer or road worker in later life.
From 1953 onwards,
he was regularly interviewed by Hugh Shields, who recorded about sixty songs from him within a couple of years, either in manuscript form or, later, through tape recording equipment, and published some of these songs in the 1981 book Shamrock, Rose & Thistle.

In 1966, Butcher began to sing frequently on radio from Dublin or Belfast and some of his songs were released on discs, first in 1969 on the EP Adam in Paradise, followed in 1976 by an LP, also titled Shamrock, Rose & Thistle. These radio broadcasts brought him some renown, and attracted the attention of local tradition bearers like Joe Holmes (1906-1978) and Len Graham (b. 1944), with whom he sang and performed. They joined him at his home for the 1975 sessions that yielded two albums of rare Ulster songs: Butcher's I Once Was a Daysman, and Chaste Muses, Bards and Sages by Holmes & Graham. Other frequent visitors to his house included Jackie Devenney (Coleraine), Brian Mullen (Derry), and occasionally Andy Irvine (b. 1942) who, along with Paul Brady (b. 1947), has re-interpreted several of Butcher's songs since the 1970s, often by adding instrumental accompaniment. In 1978, Butcher released his final album: Sings the Titanic and Other Traditional Folk Songs. Two cassettes, featuring eight previously unreleased songs and entitled Shamrock, Rose & Thistle 2 and Shamrock, Rose & Thistle 3, were released posthumously in 1983 by Shields on behalf of the Folk Music Society of Ireland.  

Some of the songs in Butcher's repertoire had also been collected from other sources by Sam Henry for inclusion in his column, Songs of the People, published weekly in Coleraine's Northern Constitution from 1923 until 1939. This treasury of nearly 700 songs fostered many recordings from the 1950s onwards, and several of these songs are therefore listed as having been recorded by Butcher, and other singers, in the book Sam Henry's Songs of the People, published in 1990.

In 2011, the Irish Traditional Music Archive published the book All the Days of His Life, releasing Shields' extensive work, edited by his wife Lisa Shields and Nicholas Carolan, and telling Butcher's story in his own words. The book is accompanied by three CDs containing a further 67 songs of Butcher's previously unreleased recordings.

Death
Eddie Butcher died on 8 September 1980. An article entitled "An old friend: Eddie Butcher" was published in issue  18 (November 1980) of the Folk Music Society of Ireland's newsletter, Ceol Tíre, in which Shields stated:

Discography

Solo recordings
 Adam in Paradise (Ulster Folk UFM.1 EP, 1969) – Release of: "The Inniskilling Dragoon", "I Long For to Get Married", "Adam in Paradise" and "The Cocks Are Crowing"
 Shamrock Rose & Thistle (Leader LED 2070 LP, 1976) – Release of 14 songs
 I Once Was a Daysman (Free Reed FRR 003 LP, 1976) – Release of 11 songs
 Sings The Titanic and Other Traditional Folk Songs (Outlet OAS3007 LP, 1978) – Release of 14 songs
 Shamrock Rose & Thistle 2 (FMSI cassette, 1983) – Release of: "Alexander", "The Faughan Side", "The Mason's Word", and the last verse of "The Banks of Kilrea"
 Shamrock Rose & Thistle 3 (FMSI cassette, 1983) – Release of: a song fragment of "The Bonny Irish Boy", "Down By the Canal", "Pat Reilly", and "The Widows Daughter"
 Adam in Paradise (ITMA 101 CD, 2005) – Re-release of the 1969 EP
 All the Days of His Life : Eddie Butcher in His Own Words (ITMA 3x CDs set, 2011) – Release of 67 previously unreleased songs sung by Eddie Butcher, as a set of companion recordings to the book of the same title with the lyrics and notated music of all the songs.

Compilations
 Folk Ballads from Donegal and Derry (Leader LEA 4055 LP, 1972) – Includes Butcher's "The Bride Stolen By Fairies" and "The Widow's Daughter"
 Come Let Us Buy the Licence (The Voice of the People Vol. 1) (Topic TSCD651 CD, 1998) – Includes Butcher's "David's Flowery Vale"
 Farewell, My Own Dear Native Land (The Voice of the People Vol. 4) (Topic TSCD654, CD 1998) – Includes Butcher's "Killyclare"
 Come All My Lads That Follow the Plough (The Voice of the People Vol. 5) (Topic TSCD655 CD, 1998) – Includes Butcher's "Tossing The Hay"
 Tonight I'll Make You My Bride (The Voice of the People Vol. 6) (Topic TSCD656 CD, 1998) – Includes Butcher's "Another Man's Wedding"
 This Label is Not Removable (Free Reed FRTCD 25; 3x CDs set, 2002) – Includes Butcher's "Let them come to Ireland", "Down the moor", and "The Hiring Fair"
 Revival re: Masters (Free Reed FRRRS-128 ; 18x CDs box set, 2008) – Includes 1x CD combining Butcher's I Once Was A Daysman (11 songs, plus a bonus track: ""The Mountain Streams") with Chaste Muses, Bards & Sages (9 songs) by Joe Holmes and Len Graham

Bibliography

Song collection 
The following two tables show the songs from Butcher's collection that were recorded and published in print.

List of recorded songs 

 Song title – the title of the song; an asterisk (*) indicates Eddie Butcher wrote the song (this column is sortable)
 Singer – the name of the singer (this column is sortable) 
 Album – the title of the album featuring the recorded song (this column is sortable)
 Year – the year the album was released (this column is sortable)
 Notes – a reference about the song and/or its recording (this column is not sortable).

List of printed songs 

 Song title – the title of the song; an asterisk (*) indicates Eddie Butcher wrote the song (this column is sortable)
 Year – the year the song was collected (this column is sortable)
 Book – the title of the book featuring the published song, including score notation (this column is sortable)
 Notes – a reference about the song and/or its publication (this column is not sortable).

Notes

References

Further reading

External links
 

 

 

1900 births
1980 deaths
People from County Londonderry
20th-century Irish male singers
Irish folk singers
Irish folk-song collectors
Musicians from County Londonderry
20th-century musicologists